Blangy—Glisy station (French: Gare de Blangy—Glisy) is a closed railway station in the Picardy region of France. It was served by trains of the TER Picardie regional rail network. The station is located half-way of the villages of Glisy and Blangy-Tronville. As of 2010, it is served by a TER taxi service.

Services
Two TER Picardie rail lines served Blangy-Glisy:

Amiens - Laon - Reims
Amiens - Saint-Quentin

References

Defunct railway stations in Somme (department)